Pumpenbil is a town located in north-eastern New South Wales, Australia, in the Tweed Shire.

Demographics

The median age of the Pumpenbil population was 49 years, 12 years above the national median of 37.

79.5% of people living in Pumpenbil were born in Australia. The other top responses for country of birth were England 4.5%, New Zealand 1.8%, Scotland 1.6%, Zimbabwe 0.9%, Belgium 0.7%, 9.5% other countries.

93.7% of people spoke only English at home; the next most common language was French with 0.9%.

The most commonly reported religious affiliation was "no religion" 28.9%, followed by Anglican 17.7%, and Catholic 15.0%.

References 

Suburbs of Tweed Heads, New South Wales